Spaulding High School may refer to a high school in the United States:

 Spaulding High School (Barre, Vermont)
 Spaulding High School (New Hampshire), in Rochester

See also
Spalding High School (disambiguation)